The Promenade des Berges de la Seine is a public park and promenade located along the left bank of the Seine river in the 7th arrondissement of Paris, between the Pont de l'Alma and the Musée d'Orsay. The promenade, created on the former highway that ran along the left bank, includes five floating gardens, planted atop barges, plus exhibition areas, performance and classroom spaces, playgrounds, sports facilities and cafes. Begun in 2008, it was opened by Mayor Bertrand Delanoë on June 19, 2013. Everything in the park can be dismantled and moved within 24 hours if the water of the river rises too high.

History
The first quay along the Seine, the Quai des Grand-Augustins, was built at the beginning of the 16th century. By the early 19th century the riverbanks were fully paved and developed; the site of the modern park was occupied by a depot for building stones, docks, and some waterfront cafes. In the early 20th century it was the home of a floating swimming pool. Between 1961 and 1967, a highway was built along the river to reduce traffic in the center of the city. In 1991 the banks of the Seine were declared a UNESCO cultural site, and efforts began to turn the waterfront into a park. Beginning in 2001, the highway was closed to traffic on Sundays and used by runners and promenaders. In 2008, under Mayor Bertrand Delanoe, a project was approved to turn the section of the highway from the Musee D'Orsay to the Pont de l'Alma into a permanent public promenade.

The promenade was designed by architect Franklin Azzi, while one of the most prominent new features, a series of five floating gardens, was created by Jean Christophe Chobet. The project cost a total of 35 million euros, and was dedicated by Mayor Delanoe on June 19, 2013.

Description
The promenade is 2.3 kilometers long, and occupies an area of 4.5 hectares. It is accessible by the former onramps and offramps that once served the highway.

The most unusual feature of the park is the floating garden, composed of five "islands", or barges permanently moored to the riverbank at the port du Gros Caillou, near the Pont de l'Alma. The "islands" have been planted with about sixty trees, 280 bushes, and three thousand other plants, and provide benches and chairs for relaxing beside the river. They are securely anchored to the bottom of the river, and designed to resist a flood higher than the great Paris flood of 1910.

Another unusual feature of the promenade is a group of tipis which can be hired, and a collection of cargo containers with large glass windows which have been turned into meeting rooms which can be rented for use for parties, banquets or meetings.

The promenade has several playgrounds, as well as a climbing wall and a course for gymnastics and exercises. It also has meeting spaces for classes in dance and sports, performance spaces and open-air classrooms, and an area for outdoor photo exhibits. There are several outdoor cafes near the bridges along the promenade.

Given that the park is situated just above the level of the river, and well below the street level of Paris, all the equipment and structures in the park are designed to be portable. With twenty-four hours' notice, everything moveable in the park can be taken to higher ground in the event that the site is flooded.

See also
History of parks and gardens of Paris
List of parks and gardens in Paris

References

External links

 Official site of the park 

Parks and open spaces in Paris